Macrouridophora is a genus of flatworms belonging to the family Diclidophoridae.

The species of this genus are found in Australia and Northern America.

Species:

Macrouridophora attenuata 
Macrouridophora caudata 
Macrouridophora coelorhynchi 
Macrouridophora halargyrea 
Macrouridophora lotella 
Macrouridophora macruri 
Macrouridophora nezumiae 
Macrouridophora papilio 
Macrouridophora paracoelorhynchi 
Macrouridophora physiculi 
Macrouridophora tubiformis

References

Monogenea genera
Diclidophoridae